Nunca Más is Spanish for "never again". It may refer to:

 Nunca Más report (Never Again), 1984, by Argentina's National Commission on the Disappearance of Persons
 Nunca Más, a public holiday in Uruguay
Plataforma Nunca Máis, Galician political movement
Brasil: Nunca Mais, a book detailing killings by the Brazilian dictatorship
 Ya nunca más (film), a 1984 Mexican film directed by Abel Salazar
Ya nunca más (album), a 1984 album by Luis Miguel

See also
Never Again (disambiguation)

Spanish words and phrases